Ekamai International School (EIS) is a private, non-profit, co-educational, international school founded by the Seventh-day Adventist Church. It is located in Watthana District, Bangkok, Thailand and educates students from pre-kindergarten to the twelfth grade. In 1993, the school acquired an international school license. The school is part of the worldwide Seventh-day Adventist education system.

History

From the end of World War II in 1945, missionaries from the US entered Thailand for evangelization. In 1946, American Adventist missionaries founded a church missionary training institution, located at Phyathai Road. The first classes in the 1940s were held in a temporary building made out of thatched bamboo and a metal roof.

In 1957, the school moved to its present location and was named Adventist English School as several properties in Soi Ekamai (Sukhumvit 63) were purchased and consolidated to expand the campus. Until the 1970s, the school enrollments were limited to the children of American missionaries and expatriate foreign residents. The school was the first in Thailand to use English as a medium of instruction.

In 1992, during the government of Anand Panyarachun, Thailand's Ministry of Education classified the Adventist English School as an international school. Therefore, the institution was renamed as Ekamai International School and continues to operate under this name until the present day. 

In 1998, the school received accreditation by the Western Association of Schools and Colleges (WASC) and adopted the academic credit system based on American high schools. The school later offers AP (Advanced Placement) programs and examinations authorized by the College Board in high school level.

Curriculum
The school teaches a curriculum based on the US education system in American English from pre-kindergarten to the twelfth grade with AP (Advanced Placement) Program by the College Board. Thai language and cultural instruction is given along with several foreign languages such as Mandarin Chinese, Japanese and Spanish classes. The school is open to pupils of all nationalities and religions.

The school is a member of the International Schools Association of Thailand, and of the East Asia Regional Council of Overseas Schools. Other authorizing bodies include the Western Association of Schools and Colleges, California, US; the International Schools Association of Thailand (ISAT); the Adventist Accrediting Association (AAA) - the official Seventh-day Adventist Education Department's accreditation body, headquartered in Maryland, US; and the Office for National Education Standards and Quality Assessment.

The school offers a general education diploma; a college preparatory diploma; a college preparatory diploma with a focus on business studies and a college preparatory diploma with a focus on medicine or engineering.

Students attend religious education classes and a weekly chapel service. There are after-school Bible studies, spiritual self-development programs, and school wide prayer groups.

Facilities
The school facilities include a high school building; a middle school building with a conference room; and a primary and elementary building. There is also a music education and "pathfinder" building. The school has a soccer field and a covered court that serves as basketball, tennis, and badminton courts. Other facilities include libraries, health clinic, counseling offices, storage areas, science and computer laboratories, and a chaplaincy. The school has an air-conditioned cafeteria, a snack bar, a bakery, and a uniform shop.

Administrators

See also

 List of Seventh-day Adventist secondary and elementary schools
 List of Seventh-day Adventist secondary schools
 Seventh-day Adventist education
 List of International Schools
 Western Association of Schools and Colleges
 East Asia Regional Council of Overseas Schools

References

External links

1946 establishments in Thailand
American international schools in Thailand
Christian schools in Thailand
Educational institutions established in 1946
International schools in Bangkok
Private schools in Thailand
Secondary schools affiliated with the Seventh-day Adventist Church